Iron Township is the name of two townships in the U.S. state of Missouri:

Iron Township, Iron County, Missouri
Iron Township, Saint Francois County, Missouri

See also
Iron (disambiguation)
Iron River Township, Michigan
Iron Range Township, Itasca County, Minnesota

Missouri township disambiguation pages